Patrick Agyemang (born 29 September 1980) is a former professional footballer who played as a forward.

Agyemang began his career at Wimbledon, progressing through the club's youth system. He was loaned out to Brentford in October 1999 for three months, before returning to his parent club. Agyemang went on to play regularly for Wimbledon for the next four seasons. He joined Gillingham in January 2004, spending ten months with the club. He signed for Preston North End in November 2004 for a fee of £350,000. He spent four seasons at Preston, before joining Queens Park Rangers in 2008. He was part of the QPR team that earned promotion to the Premier League during the 2010–11 season.

During the 2011–12 season, Agyemang was loaned out to Championship club Millwall on a one-month loan deal. He was loaned out for a second time in January 2012, this time joining Stevenage until the end of the 2011–12 season. Agyemang signed for Stevenage on a permanent basis in August 2012. In February 2013, he joined Portsmouth on loan for the rest of the campaign. He signed for the club permanently in May 2013, and during his two-year spell there was loaned out to Dagenham & Redbridge. He retired from playing in the summer of 2015, although he briefly played for non-League Baffins Milton Rovers and Cray Valley Paper Mills. Born in England, Agyemang qualified to play for the Ghana national team through his ancestry, earning two caps and scoring one goal.

Club career

Wimbledon

Agyemang left school at the age of 16 and was offered academy scholarships by Wimbledon and Charlton Athletic. He opted to sign for Wimbledon as they had a reputation for giving their academy players first-team opportunities. Prior to making his Wimbledon first-team debut, Agyemang was loaned out to Brentford on a three-month loan agreement during the 1999–2000 season. He made his Brentford debut in a 2–1 home defeat to Gillingham on 19 October 1999, coming on as a 56th-minute substitute in the match. Agyemang made 12 appearances for the club during the three-month spell, of which three were starting appearances. Whilst he did not score during his time at Brentford, Agyemang stated he gained a lot of confidence from his performances. He returned to Wimbledon in January 2000.

The 2000–01 season served as Agyemang's breakthrough season at Wimbledon, starting the first game of the season, a 0–0 home draw with Tranmere Rovers. Agyemang played regularly during the campaign, and he scored his first professional goal in a 2–2 away draw against Wycombe Wanderers on 17 February 2001. The goal served as the catalyst for a run of five goals in nine appearances for Agyemang. The following season, Agyemang scored four goals in 35 games as Wimbledon finished in ninth place in Division One. Agyemang scored six goals in 36 games during the 2002–03 season. He finished the 2003–04 season as Wimbledon's top goalscorer for the campaign despite only being there for the first half of the season, scoring seven goals in all competitions.

Gillingham
Due to Wimbledon's financial problems, Agyemang was sold to fellow Division One club Gillingham on 2 January 2004 for a fee of £150,000. Agyemang stated he "never wanted to leave Wimbledon", but understood the financial problems the club were facing. Wimbledon manager Stuart Murdoch revealed he was told he could not play Agyemang in certain games towards the end of his time at the club "in case injury jeopardised the deal", with the club in need of the funds from his sale.

Agyemang made his Gillingham debut in a 2–1 away loss to Derby County on 17 January 2004,  and scored his first goal for the club two weeks later, scoring the only goal of the game as Gillingham beat Bradford City 1–0 at Priestfield.  He went on to score a further five goals during the latter stages of the 2003–04 season, which included the first brace of his career against Walsall on 12 April 2004, as well as the winner against his former employers, Wimbledon. After scoring twice for Gillingham in 14 appearances in the opening months of the 2004–05 campaign, Agyemang attracted the interest of fellow Championship club Preston North End.

Preston North End
Preston announced they had agreed a fee with Gillingham for Agyemang on 14 November 2004, with the transfer worth in the region of £350,000. The transfer was officially completed on 16 November 2004. He made his Preston debut in a 1–0 away win against Cardiff City on 19 November 2004, playing the first 73 minutes of the match. Agyemang scored his first goal for Preston in the club's 3–0 home win over Reading on 28 December 2004. He went on to make 31 appearances in his first season with the Lancashire club, scoring four goals, but ultimately finished the campaign playing a peripheral role behind forwards Richard Cresswell and David Nugent. This included three second-half substitute appearances in the Championship play-offs that season, with Preston losing out on a place in the Premier League following a 1–0 defeat to West Ham in the final. Agyemang featured regularly throughout Preston's 2005–06 campaign, scoring six times in 49 matches, including playing in both of Preston's play-off games, with Preston losing by a 3–1 aggregate scoreline to Leeds United. The six goals he scored during the season meant he was the club's second highest goalscorer for the season.

Agyemang spent the majority of his opening years at Preston making appearances from the substitute's bench. However, he was a regular starter early in the 2006–07 season. During this time, he scored an overhead kick in a 1–0 home victory against West Brom on 12 September 2006. The goal was later described as "one of the best goals seen at Deepdale in the last couple of decades", with Preston manager Paul Simpson stating "only Patrick who could have the nerve to think that could be done". He scored seven times in 33 appearances during the campaign, with Preston missing out on the play-offs positions by a point. Agyemang scored four goals in 22 appearances for Preston during the 2007–08 season, including a brace in a 5–1 home victory against Southampton on 2 October 2007.

Queens Park Rangers
During the 2008 January transfer window, Agyemang was linked with a transfer to Leicester City and Queens Park Rangers, with his Preston contract set to expire in the summer of 2008. He ultimately signed for Queens Park Rangers, for a nominal fee on 3 January 2008, on a four-and-a-half year contract. Agyemang made his QPR debut two days after signing for the club, coming on as a second-half substitute in the club's 1–0 FA Cup defeat away to Chelsea. In the club's next match, he scored his first goal in a 2–1 away defeat against Sheffield United. He went on to score a further seven goals in five league games. He made 18 appearances for QPR during the second half of the 2007–08 season, scoring nine goals. The 2008–09 season saw Agyemang struggle for starting appearances at QPR, with the forward making twelve starting appearances during the campaign, and 23 appearances in total, scoring two goals.

Agyemang subsequently signed on loan for Championship club Bristol City until the end of the 2009–10 season on 25 January 2010. He made his first start for Bristol City in a 6–0 home defeat to Cardiff City a day later, and went on to make seven appearances during an injury-hit four months with the club. He returned to QPR for their successful 2010–11 season, scoring his first goal of the season in a 2–2 draw away at Derby County – the goal came in injury time and helped QPR maintain their unbeaten start to the season. A stress fracture of his tibia would ultimately rule Agyemang out for the majority of the season. He went on to make 19 appearances in the league, all of them coming off the substitute's bench, as QPR won promotion to the Premier League.

Following the acquisition of strikers DJ Campbell and Jay Bothroyd ahead of QPR's return to the top tier of English football, Agyemang found first-team football limited, although he did start in the club's first away game of the season, a 1–0 triumph against Everton at Goodison Park on 20 August 2011. The following week, on 27 August 2011, he played the whole match as QPR lost 2–0 away to Wigan Athletic, which would ultimately be Agyemang's final QPR appearance for the season. Agyemang was made available for loan in October 2011. He subsequently joined Championship club Millwall on a 28-day loan deal on 13 October 2011. Agyemang made his Millwall debut two days after signing, playing the first 45 minutes in a 1–1 away draw against Middlesbrough on 15 October 2011. He made one further appearance during his loan spell, a late substitute appearance against Brighton & Hove Albion, and returned to QPR in November 2011. Agyemang was omitted from QPR's 25-man squad for the remainder of the season.

Stevenage
After four months without first-team football, Agyemang joined League One club Stevenage on 8 March 2012, on a loan agreement until the end of the 2011–12 season. The move re-united Agyemang with Gary Smith, who had previously coached him at Wimbledon. He made his Stevenage debut two days after joining the club, playing the first 61 minutes in Stevenage's 2–2 home draw against Chesterfield. Agyemang scored his first goal for Stevenage in a 6–0 away win against Yeovil Town, latching onto a Jamaal Lascelles through pass before scoring with a "tidy finish". He made 15 appearances for the club as they lost in the play-off semi-final to Sheffield United. Agyemang was released by QPR upon the expiry of his contract in June 2012.

Agyemang spent the early stages of pre-season ahead of the 2012–13 season training with Stevenage, and went on the club's pre-season tour of Ireland. He went on a week's trial with Bidvest Wits of the Premier Soccer League in South Africa in August 2012. No transfer materialised, and, on 31 August 2012, he signed for Stevenage on a free transfer.

Portsmouth
Having made 16 appearances for Stevenage during the first half of the season, without finding the scoresheet, Agyemang joined Portsmouth of League One on a one-month loan deal on 8 February 2013. He made his first appearance for Portsmouth in a 2–0 defeat to AFC Bournemouth on 9 February 2013, playing the opening 65 minutes of the match. Agyemang scored his first goal for the club during his sixth appearance, on 2 March 2013, finding the bottom corner of the goal in a 2–1 away victory against Crewe Alexandra. He also assisted Portsmouth's other goal in the match, as they ended a run of 23 games without a win. Agyemang's loan deal was extended for a further month on 8 March 2013. Although Portsmouth were relegated to League Two during his time on loan with the club, his performances were described as a "critical reason for the marked improvement" as Portsmouth ended the season in good form. He made 15 appearances during the loan spell, and expressed a desire to remain at Portsmouth on a permanent basis.

Shortly after the end of the season, Agyemang agreed a two-year permanent transfer to Portsmouth, joining the club on 1 July 2013, after his Stevenage contract expired. He played regularly during the 2013–14 season, scoring five times in 44 appearances as Portsmouth finished the campaign in 13th place in League Two. Agyemang did not play as much following the departure of manager Guy Whittingham, making ten appearances for Portsmouth during the first half of the following season. He subsequently joined fellow League Two club Dagenham & Redbridge on loan on 24 November 2014. He made four appearances during the loan agreement, which ran until 3 January 2015. Agyemang left Portsmouth by mutual consent on 24 March 2015.

Later career
Without a club and training on his own ahead of the 2015–16 season, Agyemang made the decision to retire from playing after he suffered a knee injury and felt he could no longer push his body to the level required to play professional football. Agyemang briefly came out of retirement, having not played competitive senior football since leaving Portsmouth two years earlier, to play for Baffins Milton Rovers of the Wessex League Premier Division in November 2017. He made one appearance during his time at the club, playing in a 4–1 defeat to Horley Town in the FA Vase. Agyemang also made one appearance for Cray Valley Paper Mills of the Southern Counties East League, starting in a 5–3 away win against Lordswood on 18 August 2018.

International career
Agyemang made his international debut for Ghana against Nigeria on 30 May 2003, in the 4-Nation LG Cup in Abuja, with Nigeria winning the match 3–1. He scored Ghana's solitary goal in the match, with the strike coming three minutes into his debut.

He was named in Ghana's 40-man preliminary squad ahead of the 2006 Africa Cup of Nations, although did not make the final squad. In February 2006, Agyemang was called up to play for Ghana in the pre-2006 World Cup international friendly against Mexico on 1 March 2006, played in the USA. He started the match, playing 74 minutes before being substituted for Alex Tachie-Mensah. Despite offering an alternative to other attacking options due to his height and physical presence, Agyemang did not make Ghana's 23-man squad.

Style of play
Agyemang was deployed as a forward throughout his career. Described as powerful and possessing "great pace", Agyemang stated he had a tendency to play on the shoulder of the last defender as he was confident his pace would create goalscoring opportunities. He stated he was wrongly labelled as a target man by managers in the latter stages of his career and felt the role was not playing to his strengths — "I hated heading the ball. My best attribute was getting the ball down to my feet and getting past players, running the channels".

Personal life
After retiring from playing football, Agyemang began working as a personal trainer.

Career statistics

Club

International

Ghana score listed first, score column indicates score after each Agyemang goal.

Honours
Queens Park Rangers
Football League Championship: 2010–11

References

External links

1980 births
Living people
Footballers from Walthamstow
English sportspeople of Ghanaian descent
Citizens of Ghana through descent
English footballers
Ghanaian footballers
Ghana international footballers
Association football forwards
Wimbledon F.C. players
Brentford F.C. players
Gillingham F.C. players
Preston North End F.C. players
Queens Park Rangers F.C. players
Bristol City F.C. players
Millwall F.C. players
Stevenage F.C. players
Portsmouth F.C. players
Dagenham & Redbridge F.C. players
Baffins Milton Rovers F.C. players
Cray Valley Paper Mills F.C. players
Premier League players
English Football League players